The 1983–84 Marshall Thundering Herd men's basketball team represented Marshall University during the 1983–84 NCAA Division I men's basketball season. The Thundering Herd, led by first-year head coach Rick Huckabay, played their home games at the Cam Henderson Center as members of the Southern Conference. They finished the season 25–6, 13–3 in SoCon play to finish in first place. They received the SoCon's automatic bid to the NCAA tournament where, as a No. 10 seed, they lost to No. 7 seed Villanova in the opening round.

Roster

Schedule and results

|-
!colspan=9 style=| Regular season

|-
!colspan=9 style=| SoCon tournament

|-
!colspan=9 style=| NCAA tournament

References

Marshall Thundering Herd men's basketball seasons
Marshall
Marshall
Marshall Thundering Herd basketball (men's)
Marshall Thundering Herd basketball (men's)